Choleothrips is a genus of thrips in the family Phlaeothripidae. It is found in Australia in New South Wales and Queensland.

Species
 Choleothrips geijerae
 Choleothrips percnus

References

Phlaeothripidae
Thrips
Thrips genera